Tommy Batchelor is an American dancer currently residing in Palm Beach Gardens, Florida.

Career

Batchelor began his  training at the age of four at the "Dance Factory" in Minnesota, later continuing his training at Bak Middle School of the Arts in Palm Beach County, Florida, Nicole's Dance Studio, and Palm Beach Ballet Center.

Batchelor began his dancing career with two productions of The Nutcracker.  Both of Batchelor's performances occurred with the Miami City Ballet in 2006 and 2010.

After his successful audition, Batchelor was cast in the part of "Billy" in the Broadway production of Billy Elliot: The Musical.  Batchelor played his first performance on February 10, 2009.  He played the Part of Billy until December 11, 2009.  Batchelor left the Broadway production to reprise his role as "Billy" at the Oriental Theatre in Chicago, Illinois.  Batchelor performed in Chicago as Billy between March 19, 2010 and October 10, 2010.
Playing Billy Elliot required Tommy to be on stage for most of two hours and fifty minutes, acting and singing in a Northern British accent, dancing ballet, tap, and interpretive dance. "It's a lot of work," said Tommy, "but I love it, and the more you do it, and the more stamina you develop, the more fun it is."
At the age of 18, Tommy continued his career joining the cast of "The Who's Tommy" as a dance soloist and ensemble member at the Short North Stage, Columbus, Ohio. Tommy currently attends The Ohio State University (OSU) as a Dance Major; performing in such productions as Dance Downtown and Drums Downtown with OSU.

Credits

[The Who's Tommy the Musical] March 16, 2014 to April 27, 2014 Columbus, OH

References

External links

Batchelor's Youtube Channel

Living people
American male ballet dancers
People from Palm Beach Gardens, Florida
Year of birth missing (living people)